MV Glory Sea is a China-registered passenger ship. The ship was built in Germany in 2001 by Blohm + Voss and originally named Olympia Explorer. The ship was later renamed MV Explorer when it began sailing for the Semester at Sea program in 2004. The ship remained with them until 2015.

In May 2015, the ship was renamed Celestyal Odyssey and began sailing for Celestyal Cruises, under the flag of Malta.

In September 2015 it was announced that Celestyal Cruises has terminated their three-year contract of owning the Celestyal Odyssey. The ship will leave the fleet late October 2015.

The ship was sold to be used as the first ship of Diamond Cruises a new Chinese based cruise line.

References

External links

 Professional photographs from shipspotting.com
 

2000 ships
Passenger ships
Ships built in Hamburg
Merchant ships of Greece
Merchant ships of the Bahamas
Cruise ships